In metalworking, crimping is a method of joining two or more pieces of metal or other ductile material by deforming one or both of them to hold the other. The bend or deformity is called the crimp.

Wire connectors 

The metals are joined via a special connector. Stripped wire (often stranded) is inserted through the correctly sized opening of the connector, and a crimper is used to tightly squeeze the opening against the wire. Depending on the type of connector used, it may be attached to a metal plate by a separate screw or bolt or it could be simply screwed on using the connector itself to make the attachment like an F connector.

Uses 

Crimping is most extensively used in metalworking. Crimping is commonly used to fix bullets in their cartridge cases, for rapid but lasting electrical connections, securing lids on metal food cans, and many other applications. Because it can be a cold-working technique, crimping can also be used to form a strong bond between the workpiece and a non-metallic component.

When joining segments of tubular sheet metal pipe, such as for smoke pipes for wood stoves, downspouts for rain gutters,  or for installation of ventilation ducting, one end of a tube is treated with a crimping tool to make a slip joint into the next section of duct. The joint will not be liquid-tight but will be adequate for conveying low pressure fluids. Crimp joints may be arranged to prevent accumulation of dirt.

In jewelry manufacture, crimp beads, or crimp tubes, are used to make secure joints in fine wire, such as used in clasps or tie loops. A crimped lead (or other soft metal) seal is attached to secure wires used to secure fasteners in aircraft, or to provide visual evidence of tampering when securing a utility meter or as a seal on cargo containers.

In plumbing, there is a trend in some jurisdictions towards the use of crimped fittings to join metallic pipes, replacing the traditional soldering or "sweating" of joints. This trend is driven in part by increased restrictions or bans of processes involving open flames, which may now require costly special permits.

See also 
 Pliers

References 

Fabrication (metal)
Jewellery components
Joining